Hoshimi (written: 星美 or ほしみ in hiragana) may refer to:

 (born 1990), Japanese gravure model and AV idol
, train station in Teine-ku, Sapporo, Hokkaidō, Japan

Japanese-language surnames